Jak 2 can refer to:

 Jak II, the second installment in the Jak and Daxter video game series
 JAK2, member of the Janus kinase family